Nunawading Christian College is an independent Seventh-day Adventist co-educational early learning, primary and secondary day school, located in the Melbourne suburb of Nunawading, Victoria, Australia.

The College is part of the Seventh-day Adventist Church's worldwide educational system.

Overview 
Established in 1964, Nunawading Christian College (NCC) consists of an early learning centre, primary school and secondary school, which work together to provide quality Christian education.  The College was established by the Seventh-day Adventist Church. All Seventh-day Adventist Schools in the State of Victoria form a single system with each school tied constitutionally to Seventh-day Adventist Schools (Victoria) Inc.  This central organisation controls the employment of teaching staff and, through a committee, determines the distribution of financial resources between schools.

The College is open to young people who are willing to accept its standards of conduct.

Nunawading Christian College is controlled by a School Council which is responsible for financial management, pupil enrolment, and the maintenance of the school facilities. Responsibility for the day-to-day operation of the school rests with the Principal and staff.

Spiritual aspects 
All students take religion classes each year that they are enrolled. These classes cover topics in biblical history and Christian and denominational doctrines. Instructors in other disciplines also begin each class period with prayer or a short devotional thought, many which encourage student input. Weekly, the entire student body gathers together for an hour-long chapel service. Outside the classrooms there is year-round spiritually oriented programming that relies on student involvement.

Extracurricular activities

Sport 
The school is member of the Eastern Independent Schools of Melbourne (EISM). NCC students participate in a variety of team and individual sports against students from other EISM member schools.

EISM premierships 
NCC has won the following EISM senior premierships.

Boys:

 Touch Rugby (3) - 2013, 2016, 2017
 Volleyball (2) - 2002, 2020

Girls:

 Basketball - 2018
 Soccer (2) - 2001, 2002
 Volleyball (7) - 2002, 2003, 2006, 2007, 2008, 2019, 2020

See also

 Seventh-day Adventist education
 List of non-government schools in Victoria
 List of Seventh-day Adventist secondary schools

References

External links 
 Nunawading Christian College website

Educational institutions established in 1974
Adventist secondary schools in Australia
Private primary schools in Melbourne
Adventist primary schools in Australia
1974 establishments in Australia
Private secondary schools in Melbourne
Buildings and structures in the City of Whitehorse